The 2017 Copa Sudamericana first stage was played from 28 February to 1 June 2017. A total of 44 teams competed in the first stage to decide the 22 of the 32 places in the second stage of the 2017 Copa Sudamericana.

Draw

The draw for the first stage was held on 31 January 2017, 21:00 PYST (UTC−3), at the CONMEBOL Convention Centre in Luque, Paraguay. For the first stage, the teams were divided into two pots according to their geographical zones:
Pot A (South Zone): 22 teams from Argentina, Bolivia, Chile, Paraguay, and Uruguay
Pot B (North Zone): 22 teams from Brazil, Colombia, Ecuador, Peru, and Venezuela

The 44 teams were drawn into 22 ties (G1–G22) between a team from Pot A and a team from Pot B, with the teams from Pot B hosting the second leg in odd-numbered ties, and the teams from Pot A hosting the second leg in even-numbered ties. This distribution ensured that teams from the same association could not be drawn into the same tie.

Format

In the first stage, each tie was played on a home-and-away two-legged basis. If tied on aggregate, the away goals rule would be used. If still tied, extra time would not be played, and the penalty shoot-out would be used to determine the winner (Regulations Article 6.1).

The 22 winners of the first stage advanced to the second stage to join the 10 teams transferred from the Copa Libertadores (two best teams eliminated in the third stage of qualifying and eight third-placed teams in the group stage).

Matches
The first legs were played on 28 February, 1–2 March, and 4–6 April, and the second legs were played on 9–11 May, 30–31 May and 1 June 2017.

|}

Match G1

Nacional Potosí won 4–3 on aggregate and advanced to the second stage.

Match G2

Tied 2–2 on aggregate, Deportivo Cali won on away goals and advanced to the second stage.

Match G3

Universidad Católica won 6–1 on aggregate and advanced to the second stage.

Match G4

LDU Quito won 4–3 on aggregate and advanced to the second stage.

Match G5

Tied 1–1 on aggregate, Patriotas won on penalties and advanced to the second stage.

Match G6

Sol de América won 10–3 on aggregate and advanced to the second stage.

Match G7

Cerro Porteño won 3–2 on aggregate and advanced to the second stage.

Match G8

Huracán won 4–3 on aggregate and advanced to the second stage.

Match G9

Tied 2–2 on aggregate, Oriente Petrolero won on penalties and advanced to the second stage.

Match G10

Corinthians won 4–1 on aggregate and advanced to the second stage.

Match G11

Independiente won 1–0 on aggregate and advanced to the second stage.

Match G12

Tied 1–1 on aggregate, Ponte Preta won on away goals and advanced to the second stage.

Match G13

Boston River won 4–2 on aggregate and advanced to the second stage.

Match G14

Arsenal won 8–1 on aggregate and advanced to the second stage.

Match G15

Fuerza Amarilla won 2–1 on aggregate and advanced to the second stage.

Match G16

Tied 2–2 on aggregate, Bolívar won on away goals and advanced to the second stage.

Match G17

Tied 1–1 on aggregate, Palestino won on penalties and advanced to the second stage.

Match G18

Tied 3–3 on aggregate, Sport Recife won on penalties and advanced to the second stage.

Match G19

Racing won 2–1 on aggregate and advanced to the second stage.

Match G20

Tied 3–3 on aggregate, Nacional won on penalties and advanced to the second stage.

Match G21

Tied 1–1 on aggregate, Defensa y Justicia won on away goals and advanced to the second stage.

Match G22

Fluminense won 2–1 on aggregate and advanced to the second stage.

Notes

References

External links
CONMEBOL Sudamericana 2017, CONMEBOL.com 

1
February 2017 sports events in South America
March 2017 sports events in South America
April 2017 sports events in South America
May 2017 sports events in South America
June 2017 sports events in South America